Wrzeszcz Górny (translated Higher Wrzeszcz) is an administrative district (dzielnica administracyjna) of the city of Gdańsk, Poland. It was created in 2010 by division of the district Wrzeszcz in two districts.

History 
In October 2010, some administrative districts of Gdańsk with a population of more than 50,000 had been divided in smaller districts. Wrzeszcz has been divided in Wrzeszcz Dolny and Wrzeszcz Górny.

Location 
The district is the south-western and older part of Wrzeszcz. The division was made along the railway line. Góra Strzyska with 105 meters is the highest elevation of Wrzeszcz Górny.

From the north, the district is bordered by the districts of Strzyża, Zaspa-Młyniec and Wrzeszcz Dolny, from the east by Wrzeszcz Dolny and Aniołki, from the south by Suchanino and Piecki-Migowo and from the west by Brętowo and VII Dwór.

Points of interest 

 Gdańsk University of Technology (Politechnika Gdańska)
 Gdańsk Medical University
 Baltic Opera (Opera Bałtycka)
 Gdańsk Wrzeszcz railway station
 Forest Theatre (Teatr Leśny)

References

External links 
 bip.gdansk.pl: Podział administracyjny Gdańska (Polish)
 gedanopedia.pl: Wrzeszcz (Polish)

Districts of Gdańsk